Genda Singh is an Indian politician. He was elected to the Lok Sabha, the lower house of the Parliament of India from Padrauna, Uttar Pradesh as a member of the Indian National Congress.

References

External links
  Official biographical sketch in Parliament of India website

Year of birth missing (living people)
Living people
Indian National Congress politicians
India MPs 1971–1977
Lok Sabha members from Uttar Pradesh
Praja Socialist Party politicians
Indian National Congress politicians from Uttar Pradesh